Charles T. Gelatka (January 28, 1914 – May 23, 2001) was an American football end who played four seasons with the New York Giants of the National Football League (NFL). He was drafted by the New York Giants in the tenth round of the 1937 NFL Draft. He played college football at Mississippi State University and attended Francis W. Parker School in Chicago, Illinois. Gelatka was a member of the New York Giants team that won the 1938 NFL Championship. He served in the United States Armed Forces during World War II.

References

External links
Just Sports Stats

1914 births
2001 deaths
Players of American football from Chicago
American football ends
Mississippi State Bulldogs football players
New York Giants players
American military personnel of World War II